Dubuc is a village in the Canadian province of Saskatchewan within the Rural Municipality of Grayson No. 184 and Census Division No. 5. The village is located 55 kilometres south of the City of Yorkton and 30 km west of Esterhazy.

History 
Dubuc incorporated as a village on May 29, 1905.

Demographics 

See also 

 List of communities in Saskatchewan
 Villages of Saskatchewan

References

Villages in Saskatchewan
Grayson No. 184, Saskatchewan
Division No. 5, Saskatchewan